Mohamed Sadek is a professional association football player who plays for Ismaily SC in the Egyptian Premier League and the Egyptian national football team as a winger. He scored his first goal for Ismaily on December 27, 2017.

Early career
Mohamed Sadek started his youth then senior career with El Qanah FC. Sadek was El Qanah's key player as he was their most skilled player at that time.

Transfer to Ismaily SC
On July 6, 2017. Mohamed Sadek transferred to Ismaily SC for a five-year contract, with El Qanah receiving a transfer fee of E£2 million (approx. US$,000). He scored his first goal with Ismaily in a match against El Raja SC on December 27, 2017, which ended in a 5–0 win for Ismaily SC.

National Team

In Augusts 29, 2018. Mohamed Sadek has been called to Javier Aguirre's Egypt national football team to play his first match against Tunisia and score his first goal to end the match with 1-0 for the Pharaohs.

Honours

Egypt
Africa U-23 Cup of Nations Champions: 2019

References

1997 births
Living people
People from Ismailia
Egyptian footballers
Ismaily SC players
El Qanah FC players
Egyptian Premier League players
Association football midfielders